

Events

Pre-1600
1411 – King Charles VI granted a monopoly for the ripening of Roquefort cheese to the people of Roquefort-sur-Soulzon as they had been doing for centuries.
1561 – The steeple of St Paul's, the medieval cathedral of London, is destroyed in a fire caused by lightning and is never rebuilt.

1601–1900
1615 – Siege of Osaka: Forces under Tokugawa Ieyasu take Osaka Castle in Japan.
1745 – Battle of Hohenfriedberg: Frederick the Great's Prussian army decisively defeated an Austrian army under Prince Charles Alexander of Lorraine during the War of the Austrian Succession.
1760 – Great Upheaval: New England planters arrive to claim land in Nova Scotia, Canada, taken from the Acadians.
1783 – The Montgolfier brothers publicly demonstrate their montgolfière (hot air balloon).
1784 – Élisabeth Thible becomes the first woman to fly in an untethered hot air balloon. Her flight covers four kilometres in 45 minutes, and reached 1,500 metres altitude (estimated).
1792 – Captain George Vancouver claims Puget Sound for the Kingdom of Great Britain.
1802 – King Charles Emmanuel IV of Sardinia abdicates his throne in favor of his brother, Victor Emmanuel.
1812 – Following Louisiana's admittance as a U.S. state, the Louisiana Territory is renamed the Missouri Territory.
1825 – General Lafayette, a French officer in the American Revolutionary War, speaks at what would become Lafayette Square, Buffalo, during his visit to the United States.
1859 – Italian Independence wars: In the Battle of Magenta, the French army, under Louis-Napoleon, defeat the Austrian army.
1862 – American Civil War: Confederate troops evacuate Fort Pillow on the Mississippi River, leaving the way clear for Union troops to take Memphis, Tennessee.
1876 – An express train called the Transcontinental Express arrives in San Francisco, via the First transcontinental railroad only 83 hours and 39 minutes after leaving New York City.
1878 – Cyprus Convention: The Ottoman Empire cedes Cyprus to the United Kingdom but retains nominal title.
1896 – Henry Ford completes the Ford Quadricycle, his first gasoline-powered automobile, and gives it a successful test run.

1901–present
1912 – Massachusetts becomes the first state of the United States to set a minimum wage.
1913 – Emily Davison, a suffragist, runs out in front of King George V's horse at The Derby. She is trampled, never regains consciousness, and dies four days later.
1916 – World War I: Russia opens the Brusilov Offensive with an artillery barrage of Austro-Hungarian lines in Galicia.
1917 – The first Pulitzer Prizes are awarded: Laura E. Richards, Maude H. Elliott, and Florence Hall receive the first Pulitzer for biography (for Julia Ward Howe). Jean Jules Jusserand receives the first Pulitzer for history for his work With Americans of Past and Present Days. Herbert B. Swope receives the first Pulitzer for journalism for his work for the New York World.
1919 – Women's rights: The U.S. Congress approves the 19th Amendment to the United States Constitution, which guarantees suffrage to women, and sends it to the U.S. states for ratification.
  1919   – Leon Trotsky bans the Planned Fourth Regional Congress of Peasants, Workers and Insurgents.
1920 – Hungary loses 71% of its territory and 63% of its population when the Treaty of Trianon is signed in Paris.
1928 – The President of the Republic of China, Zhang Zuolin, is assassinated by Japanese agents.
1932 – Marmaduke Grove and other Chilean military officers lead a coup d'état establishing the short-lived Socialist Republic of Chile.
1939 – The Holocaust: The , a ship carrying 963 German Jewish refugees, is denied permission to land in Florida, in the United States, after already being turned away from Cuba. Forced to return to Europe, more than 200 of its passengers later die in Nazi concentration camps.
1940 – World War II: The Dunkirk evacuation ends: the British Armed Forces completes evacuation of 338,000 troops from Dunkirk in France. To rally the morale of the country, Winston Churchill delivers, only to the House of Commons, his famous "We shall fight on the beaches" speech.
1942 – World War II: The Battle of Midway begins. The Japanese Admiral Chūichi Nagumo orders a strike on Midway Island by much of the Imperial Japanese Navy.
  1942   – World War II: Gustaf Mannerheim, the Commander-in-Chief of the Finnish Army, is granted the title of Marshal of Finland by the government on his 75th birthday. On the same day, Adolf Hitler arrives in Finland for a surprise visit to meet Mannerheim.
1943 – A military coup in Argentina ousts Ramón Castillo.
1944 – World War II: A hunter-killer group of the United States Navy captures the German Kriegsmarine submarine U-505: The first time a U.S. Navy vessel had captured an enemy vessel at sea since the 19th century.
  1944   – World War II: The United States Fifth Army captures Rome, although much of the German Fourteenth Army is able to withdraw to the north.
1961 – Cold War: In the Vienna summit, the Soviet premier Nikita Khrushchev sparks the Berlin Crisis by threatening to sign a separate peace treaty with East Germany and ending American, British and French access to East Berlin.
1967 – Seventy-two people are killed when a Canadair C-4 Argonaut crashes at Stockport in England.
1970 – Tonga gains independence from the British Empire.
1975 – The Governor of California Jerry Brown signs the California Agricultural Labor Relations Act into law, the first law in the United States giving farmworkers collective bargaining rights.
1977 – JVC introduces its VHS videotape at the Consumer Electronics Show in Chicago. It will eventually prevail against Sony's rival Betamax system in a format war to become the predominant home video medium.
1979 – Flight Lieutenant Jerry Rawlings takes power in Ghana after a military coup in which General Fred Akuffo is overthrown.
1983 – Gordon Kahl, who killed two US Marshals in Medina, North Dakota on February 13, is killed in a shootout in Smithville, Arkansas, along with a local sheriff, after a four-month manhunt. 
1986 – Jonathan Pollard pleads guilty to espionage for selling top secret United States military intelligence to Israel.
1988 – Three cars on a train carrying hexogen to Kazakhstan explode in Arzamas, Gorky Oblast, USSR, killing 91 and injuring about 1,500.
1989 – In the 1989 Iranian Supreme Leader election, Ali Khamenei is elected as the new Supreme Leader of Iran after the death and funeral of Ruhollah Khomeini.
  1989   – The Tiananmen Square protests are suppressed in Beijing by the People's Liberation Army, with between 241 and 10,000 dead (an unofficial estimate).
  1989   – Solidarity's victory in the 1989 Polish legislative election, the first election since the Communist Polish United Workers Party abandoned its monopoly of power. It sparks off the Revolutions of 1989 in Eastern Europe.
  1989   – Ufa train disaster: A natural gas explosion near Ufa, Russia, kills 575 as two trains passing each other throw sparks near a leaky pipeline.
1996 – The first flight of Ariane 5 explodes after roughly 37 seconds. It was a Cluster mission.
1998 – Terry Nichols is sentenced to life in prison for his role in the Oklahoma City bombing.
2005 – The Civic Forum of the Romanians of Covasna, Harghita and Mureș is founded.
2010 – Falcon 9 Flight 1 is the maiden flight of the SpaceX Falcon 9 rocket, which launches from Cape Canaveral Air Force Station Space Launch Complex 40.

Births

Pre-1600
1394 – Philippa of England, Queen of Denmark, Norway and Sweden (d. 1430)
1489 – Antoine, Duke of Lorraine (d. 1544)
1563 – George Heriot, Scottish goldsmith (d. 1624)

1601–1900
1604 – Claudia de' Medici, Italian daughter of Christina of Lorraine (d. 1648)
1665 – Zacharie Robutel de La Noue, Canadian captain (d. 1733)
1694 – François Quesnay, French economist and physician (d. 1774)
1704 – Benjamin Huntsman, English inventor and businessman (d. 1776)
1738 – George III of the United Kingdom (d. 1820)
1744 – Patrick Ferguson, Scottish soldier, designed the Ferguson rifle (d. 1780)
1754 – Miguel de Azcuénaga, Argentinian soldier (d. 1833)
  1754   – Franz Xaver von Zach, Slovak astronomer and academic (d. 1832)
1787 – Constant Prévost, French geologist and academic (d. 1856)
1801 – James Pennethorne, English architect, designed Victoria Park (d. 1871)
1821 – Apollon Maykov, Russian poet and playwright (d. 1897)
1829 – Jinmaku Kyūgorō, Japanese sumo wrestler, the 12th Yokozuna (d. 1903)
1854 – Solko van den Bergh, Dutch target shooter (d. 1916)
1860 – Alexis Lapointe, Canadian runner (d. 1924)
1861 – William Propsting, Australian politician, 20th Premier of Tasmania (d. 1937)
1866 – Miina Sillanpää, Finnish journalist and politician (d. 1952)
1867 – Carl Gustaf Emil Mannerheim, Finnish general and politician, 6th President of Finland (d. 1951)
1873 – Nictzin Dyalhis, American author (d.1942)
1877 – Heinrich Otto Wieland, German chemist and academic, Nobel Prize laureate (d. 1957)
1879 – Mabel Lucie Attwell, English author and illustrator (d. 1964)
1880 – Clara Blandick, American actress (d. 1962)
1885 – Arturo Rawson, Argentinian general and politician, 26th President of Argentina (d. 1952)
1889 – Beno Gutenberg, German-American seismologist (d. 1960)

1901–present
1903 – Yevgeny Mravinsky, Russian conductor (d. 1988)
1904 – Bhagat Puran Singh, Indian publisher, environmentalist, and philanthropist (d. 1992)
1907 – Jacques Roumain, Haitian journalist and politician (d. 1944)
  1907   – Rosalind Russell, American actress (d. 1976)
  1907   – Patience Strong, English poet and journalist (d. 1990)
1910 – Christopher Cockerell, English engineer, invented the hovercraft (d. 1999)
1912 – Robert Jacobsen, Danish sculptor and painter (d. 1993)
1915 – Walter Hadlee, New Zealand cricketer (d. 2006)
  1915   – Modibo Keïta, Malian educator and politician, 1st President of Mali (d. 1977)
  1915   – Nils Kihlberg, Swedish actor, singer, and director (d. 1965)
1916 – Robert F. Furchgott, American biochemist and pharmacologist, Nobel Prize laureate (d. 2009)
  1916   – Fernand Leduc, Canadian painter (d. 2014) 
1917 – Robert Merrill, American actor and singer (d. 2004)
1921 – Milan Komar, Slovenian-Argentinian philosopher and academic (d. 2006)
  1921   – Bobby Wanzer, American basketball player and coach (d. 2016)
1923 – Elizabeth Jolley, English-Australian author and academic (d. 2007)
  1923   – Masutatsu Ōyama, Japanese karateka (d. 1994)
1924 – Tofilau Eti Alesana, Samoan politician, 5th Prime Minister of Samoa (d. 1999)
  1924   – Dennis Weaver, American actor and director (d. 2006)
1925 – Antonio Puchades, Spanish footballer (d. 2013)
1926 – Robert Earl Hughes, American who was the heaviest human being recorded in the history of the world during his lifetime (d. 1958)
  1926   – Ain Kaalep, Estonian poet, playwright, and critic (d. 2020)
  1926   – Judith Malina, German-American actress and director, co-founded The Living Theatre (d. 2015)
1927 – Henning Carlsen, Danish director, producer, and screenwriter (d. 2014)
  1927   – Geoffrey Palmer, English actor (d. 2020)
1928 – Ruth Westheimer, German-American sex therapist, talk show host, professor, author, and Holocaust survivor
1929 – Karolos Papoulias, Greek lawyer and politician, 5th President of Greece (d. 2021)
1930 – George Chesworth, English air marshal and politician, Lord Lieutenant of Moray (d. 2017)
  1930   – Morgana King, American singer and actress (d. 2018)
  1930   – Viktor Tikhonov, Russian ice hockey player and coach (d. 2014)
1931 – Gustav Nossal, Austrian-Australian biologist and academic
1932 – John Drew Barrymore, American actor (d. 2004)
  1932   – Oliver Nelson, American saxophonist and composer (d. 1975)
  1932   – Maurice Shadbolt, New Zealand author and playwright (d. 2004)
1934 – Monica Dacon, Vincentian educator and politician, 6th Governor-General of Saint Vincent and the Grenadines
  1934   – Daphne Sheldrick, Kenyan-British conservationist and author (d. 2018)
1935 – Colette Boky, Canadian soprano and actress
  1935   – Berhanu Dinka, Ethiopian economist and diplomat (d. 2013)
1936 – Vince Camuto, American fashion designer and businessman, co-founded Nine West (d. 2015)
  1936   – Bruce Dern, American actor
1937 – Freddy Fender, American singer and guitarist (d. 2006)
  1937   – Mortimer Zuckerman, Canadian-American businessman and publisher, founded Boston Properties
1938 – John Harvard, Canadian journalist and politician, 23rd Lieutenant Governor of Manitoba (d. 2016)
  1938   – Art Mahaffey, American baseball player
1939 – Jeremy Browne, 11th Marquess of Sligo, Anglo-Irish peer (d. 2014)
  1939   – Denis de Belleval, Canadian civil servant and politician
  1939   – Henri Pachard, American director and producer (d. 2008)
  1939   – George Reid, Scottish journalist and politician, 2nd Presiding Officer of the Scottish Parliament
1940 – Ludwig Schwarz, Slovak-Austrian bishop
1941 – Kenneth G. Ross, Australian playwright and screenwriter
1942 – Louis Reichardt, American mountaineer
  1942   – Bill Rowe, Canadian lawyer and politician
1943 – John Burgess, Australian radio and television host
  1943   – Sandra Haynie, American golfer
  1943   – Tom Jaine, English author
1944 – Roger Ball, Scottish saxophonist and songwriter 
  1944   – Michelle Phillips, American singer-songwriter and actress 
1945 – Anthony Braxton, American saxophonist, clarinet player, and composer 
  1945   – Daniel Topolski, English rower and coach (d. 2015)
  1945   – Gordon Waller, Scottish singer-songwriter and guitarist (d. 2009)
1947 – Viktor Klima, Austrian businessman and politician, 25th Chancellor of Austria
1948 – Bob Champion, English jockey
  1948   – Sandra Post, Canadian golfer and sportscaster
  1948   – Jürgen Sparwasser, German footballer and manager
1949 – Gabriel Arcand, Canadian actor
  1949   – Mark B. Cohen, American lawyer and politician
1950 – Raymond Dumais, Canadian bishop (d. 2012)
1951 – Leigh Kennedy, American author
  1951   – Bronisław Malinowski, Polish runner (d. 1981)
  1951   – Melanie Phillips, English journalist and author
  1951   – Wendy Pini, American author and illustrator
  1951   – David Yip, English actor and playwright
1952 – Bronisław Komorowski, Polish historian and politician, 5th President of Poland
  1952   – Dambudzo Marechera, Zimbabwean author and poet (d. 1987)
1953 – Linda Lingle, American journalist and politician, 6th Governor of Hawaii
  1953   – Jimmy McCulloch, Scottish musician and songwriter (d. 1979)   
  1953   – Susumu Ojima, Japanese businessman, founded Huser
  1953   – Paul Samson, English guitarist and producer (d. 2002)
1954 – Raphael Ravenscroft, English saxophonist and composer (d. 2014)
  1954   – Kazuhiro Yamaji, Japanese actor and voice actor
1955 – Val McDermid, Scottish author
  1955   – Mary Testa, American singer and actress
1956 – Keith David, American actor
  1956   – John Hockenberry, American journalist and author
  1956   – Terry Kennedy, American baseball player and manager
  1956   – Joyce Sidman, American author and poet
1957 – Neil McNab, Scottish footballer
1959 – Juan Camacho, Bolivian runner
  1959   – Georgios Voulgarakis, Greek politician, 21st Greek Minister for Culture
  1959   – Anil Ambani, Indian businessman and Chairman of Reliance Infrastructure 
1960 – Miloš Đelmaš, Serbian footballer and manager
  1960   – Kristine Kathryn Rusch, American author
  1960   – Paul Taylor, American guitarist and keyboard player 
  1960   – Bradley Walsh, English television presenter, comedian, singer and former footballer
1961 – El DeBarge, American singer-songwriter and producer 
  1961   – Ferenc Gyurcsány, Hungarian businessman and politician, 6th Prime Minister of Hungary
1962 – Krzysztof Hołowczyc, Polish race car driver
  1962   – Zenon Jaskuła, Polish cyclist
  1962   – John P. Kee, American singer-songwriter and pastor 
  1962   – Junius Ho, Hong Kong solicitor and politician
1963 – Sean Fitzpatrick, New Zealand rugby union player
  1963   – Jim Lachey, American football player and sportscaster
  1963   – Xavier McDaniel, American basketball player and coach
1964 – Sean Pertwee, English actor
  1964   – Kōji Yamamura, Japanese animator, producer, and screenwriter
1965 – Mick Doohan, Australian motorcycle racer
  1965   – Andrea Jaeger, American tennis player and preacher
1966 – Cecilia Bartoli, Italian soprano and actress
1966 – Svetlana Jitomirskaya, American mathematician
  1966   – Vladimir Voevodsky, Russian mathematician and academic (d. 2017)
  1966   – Bill Wiggin, English politician, Shadow Secretary of State for Wales
1967 – Michael Greyeyes, Canadian actor, dancer, choreographer, director, and educator
  1967   – Robert S. Kimbrough, American colonel and astronaut
1968 – Roger Lim, American actor, director, producer, and screenwriter
  1968   – Niurka Montalvo, Cuban-Spanish long jumper
  1968   – Al B. Sure!, American R&B singer-songwriter, keyboard player, and producer
  1968   – Scott Wolf, American actor
1969 – Horatio Sanz, Chilean-American actor and comedian
1970 – Deborah Compagnoni, Italian skier
  1970   – Richie Hawtin, English-Canadian DJ and producer
  1970   – Dave Pybus, English bass player and songwriter 
  1970   – Izabella Scorupco, Polish-Swedish actress and model
1971 – Joseph Kabila, Congolese soldier and politician, President of the Democratic Republic of the Congo
  1971   – Mike Lee, American lawyer and politician
  1971   – Shoji Meguro, Japanese director and composer
  1971   – Noah Wyle, American actor and producer
1972 – Derian Hatcher, American ice hockey defenseman 
  1972   – Rob Huebel, American comedian, actor, producer, and screenwriter
1973 – Mikey Whipwreck, American wrestler and trainer
1974 – Jacob Sahaya Kumar Aruni, Indian chef (d. 2012)
  1974   – Darin Erstad, American baseball player and coach
  1974   – Andrew Gwynne, English lawyer and politician
  1974   – Janette Husárová, Slovak tennis player
  1974   – Buddy Wakefield, American poet and author
1975 – Russell Brand, English comedian and actor
  1975   – Henry Burris, American football player
  1975   – Angelina Jolie, American actress, filmmaker, humanitarian, and activist
  1975   – Dinanath Ramnarine, Trinidadian cricketer
1976 – Kasey Chambers, Australian singer-songwriter and guitarist 
  1976   – Alexei Navalny, Russian lawyer and politician
  1976   – Nenad Zimonjić, Serbian tennis player
1977 – Dionisis Chiotis, Greek footballer
  1977   – Alex Manninger, Austrian footballer
  1977   – Roman Miroshnichenko, Ukrainian guitarist and composer
  1977   – Roland G. Fryer Jr., American economist and professor
1979 – Naohiro Takahara, Japanese footballer
  1979   – Daniel Vickerman, South African-Australian rugby player (d. 2017)
1980 – François Beauchemin, Canadian ice hockey player
1981 – Jennifer Carroll, Canadian swimmer
  1981   – Giourkas Seitaridis, Greek footballer
  1981 – Gary Taylor-Fletcher, English footballer
  1981   – Natalia Vodopyanova, Russian basketball player
  1982 – Matt Gilks, Scottish footballer
1982 – Abel Kirui, Kenyan runner
  1982   – Ronnie Prude, American-Canadian football player
1983 – Romaric, Ivorian footballer
  1983   – Emmanuel Eboué, Ivorian footballer
  1983   – Olha Saladuha, Ukrainian triple jumper
  1984 – Henri Bedimo, Cameroonian footballer
1984 – Enrico Rossi Chauvenet, Italian footballer
1984 – Stuart Kettlewell, Scottish football manager and former player
  1984   – Rainie Yang, Taiwanese actress
  1984   – Ian White, Canadian ice hockey player
1985 – Leon Botha, South African painter and DJ (d. 2011)
  1985   – Anna-Lena Grönefeld, German tennis player
  1985   – Evan Lysacek, American figure skater
  1985   – Lukas Podolski, German footballer
  1985   – Oddvar Reiakvam, Norwegian politician
  1987 – Mollie King, English singer
1988 – Matt Bartkowski, American ice hockey defenseman
  1988   – Kimberley Busteed, Australian model
  1988 – Tjaronn Chery, Dutch-born Surinamese footballer
1989 – Federico Erba, Italian footballer
  1989   – Paweł Fajdek, Polish hammer thrower
1990 – Evan Spiegel, American Internet entrepreneur
1991 – Lorenzo Insigne, Italian footballer
  1991   – Matt McIlwrick, New Zealand rugby league player
  1991   – Ben Stokes, New Zealand-English cricketer
  1991 – Rajiv van La Parra, Dutch footballer
  1992 – Jordan Hugill, English footballer
1993 – Jonathan Huberdeau, Canadian ice hockey player
1993 – Juan Iturbe, Paraguayan footballer
1996 – Oli McBurnie, Scottish footballer
1999 – Kim So-hyun, South Korean actress
  1999  – Drew Pavlou, Australian activist
  2001 – Takefusa Kubo, Japanese footballer
2004 – Mackenzie Ziegler, American child actress, dancer, and recording artist
2021 – Princess Lilibet of Sussex, née Lilibet Mountbatten-Windsor, British royal

Deaths

Pre-1600
 756 – Shōmu, Japanese emperor (b. 701)
 863 – Charles, archbishop of Mainz
 895 – Li Xi, chancellor of the Tang Dynasty
 946 – Guaimar II (Gybbosus), Lombard prince 
 956 – Muhammad III of Shirvan, Muslim ruler
1039 – Conrad II, Holy Roman Emperor (b. 990)
1102 – Władysław I Herman, Polish nobleman (b. c. 1044)
1134 – Magnus I of Sweden (b. 1106)
1135 – Emperor Huizong of Song (b. 1082)
1206 – Adela of Champagne (b. 1140)
1246 – Isabella of Angoulême (b. 1188)
1257 – Przemysł I of Greater Poland (b. 1221)
1394 – Mary de Bohun, wife of Henry IV of England (b.c. 1368)
1453 – Andronikos Palaiologos Kantakouzenos, Byzantine commander
1463 – Flavio Biondo, Italian historian and author (b. 1392)
1472 – Nezahualcoyotl, Aztec poet (b. 1402)
1585 – Muretus, French philosopher and author (b. 1526)

1601–1900
1608 – Francis Caracciolo, Italian Catholic priest (b. 1563)
1622 – Péter Révay, Hungarian soldier and historian (b. 1568)
1647 – Canonicus, Grand Chief Sachem of the Narragansett (b. 1565)
1663 – William Juxon, English archbishop and academic (b. 1582)
1798 – Giacomo Casanova, Italian adventurer and author (b. 1725)
1801 – Frederick Muhlenberg, American minister and politician, 1st Speaker of the United States House of Representatives (b. 1750)
1809 – Nicolai Abildgaard, Danish neoclassical and history painter, sculptor and architect (b. 1743)
1830 – Antonio José de Sucre, Venezuelan general and politician, 2nd President of Bolivia (b. 1795)
1872 – Johan Rudolph Thorbecke, Dutch historian, jurist, and politician, Prime Minister of the Netherlands (b. 1798)
1875 – Eduard Mörike, German pastor and poet (b. 1804)
1876 – Abdülaziz of the Ottoman Empire, 32nd Sultan of the Ottoman Empire (b. 1830)

1901–present
1922 – W. H. R. Rivers, English anthropologist, neurologist, ethnologist, and psychiatrist (b. 1864)
1925 – Margaret Murray Washington, American Academic (b. 1865)
1926 – Fred Spofforth, Australian-English cricketer and coach (b. 1853)
1928 – Zhang Zuolin, Chinese warlord (b. 1873)
1929 – Harry Frazee, American director, producer, and agent (b. 1881)
1931 – Hussein bin Ali, Sharif of Mecca, Sharif and Emir of Mecca, King of the Hejaz (b. 1853–54)
1933 – Ahmet Haşim, Turkish poet and author (b. 1884)
1936 – Mathilde Verne, English pianist and educator (b. 1869)
1939 – Tommy Ladnier, American trumpet player (b. 1900)
1941 – Wilhelm II, German Emperor (b. 1859)
1942 – Reinhard Heydrich, German SS officer and politician (b. 1904)
1951 – Serge Koussevitzky, Russian-American bassist, composer, and conductor (b. 1874)
1956 – Katherine MacDonald, American actress and producer (b. 1881)
1962 – Clem McCarthy, American sportscaster (b. 1882)
1967 – Linda Eenpalu, Estonian lawyer and politician (b. 1890)
1968 – Dorothy Gish, American actress (b. 1898)
1970 – Sonny Tufts, American actor (b. 1911)
1971 – György Lukács, Hungarian historian and philosopher (b. 1885)
1973 – Maurice René Fréchet, French mathematician and academic (b. 1878)
  1973   – Murry Wilson, American songwriter, producer, and manager (b. 1917)
1981 – Leslie Averill, New Zealand doctor and soldier (b. 1897)
1989 – Dik Browne, American cartoonist (b. 1917)
1990 – Stiv Bators, American singer-songwriter and guitarist (b. 1949)
1992 – Carl Stotz, American businessman, founded Little League Baseball (b. 1910)
1993 – Bernard Evslin, American writer (b. 1922)
1994 – Derek Leckenby, English musician (b. 1943) 
1997 – Ronnie Lane, English singer-songwriter, guitarist, and producer (b. 1946) 
1998 – Josephine Hutchinson, American actress (b. 1903) 
2002 – Fernando Belaúnde Terry, Peruvian architect and politician, 42nd President of Peru (b. 1912) 
2004 – Steve Lacy, American saxophonist and composer (b. 1934) 
  2004   – Nino Manfredi, Italian actor (b. 1921) 
2007 – Clete Boyer, American baseball player and manager (b. 1937) 
  2007   – Bill France Jr., American businessman (b. 1933) 
  2007   – Craig L. Thomas, American captain and politician (b. 1933) 
2010 – John Wooden, American basketball player and coach (b. 1910) 
2011 – Juan Francisco Luis, Virgin Islander sergeant and politician, 23rd Governor of the United States Virgin Islands (b. 1940) 
  2011   – Andreas P. Nielsen, Danish author and composer (b. 1953)
2012 – Peter Beaven, New Zealand architect, designed the Lyttelton Road Tunnel Administration Building (b. 1925) 
  2012   – Pedro Borbón, Dominican-American baseball player (b. 1946)
  2012   – Rodolfo Quezada Toruño, Guatemalan cardinal (b. 1932) 
  2012   – Herb Reed, American violinist (b. 1929) 
2013 – Walt Arfons, American race car driver (b. 1916)
  2013   – Joey Covington, American drummer (b. 1945) 
  2013   – Hermann Gunnarsson, Icelandic footballer, handball player, and sportscaster (b. 1946)
  2013   – Will Wynn, American football player (b. 1949)
2014 – George Ho, American-Hong Kong businessman (b. 1919) 
  2014   – Nathan Shamuyarira, Zimbabwean journalist and politician, Zimbabwean Minister of Foreign Affairs (b. 1928)
  2014   – Sydney Templeman, Baron Templeman, English lawyer and judge (b. 1920)
  2014   – Don Zimmer, American baseball player, coach, and manager (b. 1931) 
2015 – Marguerite Patten, English economist and author (b. 1915) 
  2015   – Leonid Plyushch, Ukrainian mathematician and academic (b. 1938) 
  2015   – Jabe Thomas, American race car driver (b. 1930) 
  2015   – Anne Warburton, British academic and diplomat, British Ambassador to Denmark (b. 1927) 
2016 – Carmen Pereira, Bissau-Guinean politician (b. 1937) 
2017 – Juan Goytisolo, Spanish essayist, poet and novelist (b. 1931) 
2021 – Clarence Williams III, American actor (b. 1939)
2022 – George Lamming, Barbadian novelist (b. 1927)

Holidays and observances
Christian feast day:
Filippo Smaldone
Francis Caracciolo
Optatus
Petroc of Cornwall
Quirinus of Sescia
Saturnina
June 4 (Eastern Orthodox liturgics)
Birthday of C. G. E. Mannerheim, Marshal of Finland and the flag flying day of the Finnish Defence Forces (Finland)
Emancipation Day or Independence Day, commemorates the abolition of serfdom in Tonga by King George Tupou in 1862, and the independence of Tonga from the British protectorate in 1970. (Tonga)
International Day of Innocent Children Victims of Aggression (International)
National Unity Day (Hungary)
Trianon Treaty Day (Romania)
Tiananmen Square Protests of 1989 Memorial Day (International)
 Day of state symbols in the Republic of Kazakhstan.

References

External links

 
 
 

Days of the year
June